SAT Stadium Udon Thani is a multi-purpose stadium in Mueang Udon Thani, Udon Thani, Thailand. It was completed in 2018 and from 2019 it will be the home stadium of Udon Thani F.C., competing in the Thai League 2.  The stadium holds a capacity of 10,000 spectators.

References

Football venues in Thailand